Dan Gardner (born 1958) is an American politician from the State of Oregon. A member of the Democratic Party, he served as Commissioner of the Oregon Bureau of Labor and Industries from 2003 to 2008. An electrician by profession, he was elected Commissioner of Labor and Industries in 2002 and reelected in 2006.  He resigned in 2008 to take a job with the International Brotherhood of Electrical Workers in Washington, D.C.

Personal background
Gardner worked as an electrician for 28 years. Prior to entering politics, he was active as a union leader.

Political career
Gardner entered politics by running for and winning a seat in the Oregon House of Representatives as a Democrat in 1996.  He represented the 13th District until 2002.  He served in the Democratic leadership as Assistant Democratic Leader and House Leader.

In 2002, Gardner ran for and won the nonpartisan office of Commissioner of the Oregon Bureau of Labor and Industries.  He was reelected without opposition in 2006.

In 2008, Gardner considered running for Congress in Oregon's 5th congressional district, but chose not to run.  Instead, he took a position as a lobbyist for the International Brotherhood of Electrical Workers in Washington, D.C.  He announced his resignation as Commissioner of Labor and Industries in March 2008 and left office on April 7.  Governor Ted Kulongoski appointed Brad Avakian to replace him.

See also
 Oregon Bureau of Labor and Industries
 Oregon House of Representatives
 International Brotherhood of Electrical Workers

External links
Oregon Bureau of Labor and Industries

References

Living people
Democratic Party members of the Oregon House of Representatives
Oregon Commissioners of Labor and Industries
1958 births
Place of birth missing (living people)